The Internet Service Providers Association of Ireland, or ISPAI, is a non profit company established in 1998 that represents various Irish Internet service providers. It is a member of EuroISPA.

The association also runs the Irish Hotline, which is an anonymous reporting facility where members of the public can report child abuse material.

The association's members include ISPs, hosting companies and content providers.

External links
Official site
EuroISPA
Internet plans 

Internet service providers of the Republic of Ireland